Michał Marek (20 January 1983 – 12 May 2019) was a Polish cave diver who spent his last years in Ireland.

Life and speleological career
Marek was born in Krosno, Poland in 1983, and began open-water diving in 2002 in Kraków. Moving to Ireland in 2004, he settled in Galway and subsequently became a qualified technical diver.

In 2010 Marek met cave diver Artur Kozłowski, who introduced him to the idea of cave diving and exploration.

Over subsequent years, Marek developed his caving and cave diving skills, and accomplished much in exploration. In 2012, while on a coastal dive at Ailladie, near Fanore, County Clare, he discovered the entrance to Cliff Cave.

Marek visited Pollatoomary in 2018, and continued on from Artur Kozłowski's previous limit of exploration.

In addition to his speleological work, Marek joined the Irish Cave Rescue Organisation in 2014 and became a core team member in 2015.

Marek died on 12 May 2019 at the age of 36, while on an open-water dive on the wreck of the SS Athenia, off Malin Head, County Donegal.

References 

2019 deaths
Cave diving explorers
Polish explorers
Polish underwater divers
Speleologists
Underwater diving deaths
Polish sportsmen
Pioneering technical divers
1983 births
Polish emigrants to Ireland